Hugh de Puiset, Hugh du Puiset or Hugh de Le Puiset (French Hugues) may refer to several medieval men:
Hugh I of Le Puiset (died 1096)
Hugh I of Jaffa, also Hugh II of Le Puiset (died 1112/8), crusader
Hugh III of Le Puiset (died 1132), crusader
Hugh II of Jaffa (died 1134), crusader
Hugh de Puiset (died 1195), bishop of Durham